Hellmut Diwald (13 August 1924 – 26 May 1993) was a German historian and Professor of Medieval and Modern History at the University of Erlangen-Nuremberg from 1965 to 1985.

He was originally from southern Moravia, the son of an Austrian engineer and a Czech mother, and went to school in Prague before the family relocated to Nuremberg in Bavaria in 1938. During World War II, he served in the German Army. After the war, he went on to study mechanical engineering in Nuremberg before he studied philosophy, German and history at the universities of Hamburg and Erlangen. He earned a doctorate in history in 1952 and completed his Habilitation in 1958. In 1965, he was appointed as Professor of Medieval and Modern History at the University of Erlangen-Nuremberg, where he taught until his retirement in 1985.

Diwald earned much recognition for his books on the philosopher Wilhelm Dilthey (1963) and his publication of the works of Ernst Ludwig von Gerlach (1970), as well as for his biography of Albrecht von Wallenstein (1969) and his book on European history from 1400 to 1555. He also regularly appeared on the ZDF TV show Fragen zur Zeit and was a regular contributor of articles to the newspaper Die Welt. He is also known for a widely discussed book on German history from 1978. He published his opus magnum, Die Großen Ereignisse. Fünf Jahrtausende Weltgeschichte in Darstellungen und Dokumenten, a history of humankind during the last 5000 years in six volumes, in 1990. In 1981, he co-founded the Zeitgeschichtliche Forschungsstelle Ingolstadt.

He was married to Susanne Diwald, a scholar of Islamic studies who also taught at the University of Erlangen (until 1989).

Works 
 Untersuchungen zum Geschichtsrealismus im 19. Jahrhundert. Dissertation. Erlangen 1952
 Der Hegelianismus in Preussen von Heinrich Leo. Hrsg. Leiden-Köln, 1958
 Lebendiger Geist. Hrsg., Leiden-Köln, 1959
 Leopold von Ranke, Geschichte Wallensteins. Hrsg., Düsseldorf,  1967
 Wilhelm Dilthey, Erkenntnistheorie und Philosophie der Geschichte. Goettingen, 1963
 Wallenstein. Eine Biographie. Muenchen-Esslingen, 1969, 
 Die Freiheit des Glaubens, Freiheit und Toleranz in der abendländischen Geschichte. Hannover, 1967
 Ernst Moritz Arndt. Das Entstehen des deutschen Nationalbewußtseins. München, 1970
 Ernst Ludwig von Gerlach, Von der Revolution zum Norddeutschen Bund. Hrsg., Goettingen, 1970
 Die Anerkennung. Bericht zur Klage der Nation. München-Esslingen, 1970
 Friedrich Schiller, Wallenstein. Frankfurt/M – Berlin – Wien, 1970
 Menschen und Mächte – Geschichte im Blickpunkt. Buchreihe mit 8 Bänden, Hrsg., München, 1973
 Anspruch auf Mündigkeit, Propyläen Geschichte Europas Band 1, 1400–1555. Frankfurt/M – Berlin – Wien, 1975, 
 Geschichte der Deutschen. Propyläen. Frankfurt/M – Berlin – Wien, 1978, 
 Der Kampf um die Weltmeere. München/Zürich, 1980
 Im Zeichen des Adlers, Porträts berühmter Preußen. Hrsg., Bergisch Gladbach, 1981
 Luther. Eine Biographie. Bergisch Gladbach, 1982, 
 Lebensbilder Martin Luthers. Bergisch Gladbach, 1982
 Dokumente Deutschen Daseins. Hrsg., Krefeld, 1983
 Mut zur Geschichte. 1983, 
 Die Erben Poseidons. Seemachtpolitik im 20. Jahrh.. München, 1984
 Inferiorität als Staatsräson., Hrsg., Krefeld, 1985
 Heinrich der Erste. Die Gründung des Deutschen Reichs. Bergisch Gladbach, 1987
 Der Fall Rose. Ein Nürnberger Urteil wird widerlegt. Einleitung. Mut-Verlag, Asendorf 1988, 
 Geschichte macht Mut. Erlangen, 1989
 Deutschland Einig Vaterland. Geschichte unserer Gegenwart. Ullstein. Frankfurt/M – Berlin, 1990, 
 Die Großen Ereignisse. Fünf Jahrtausende Weltgeschichte. 6 Bände, Coron, Lachen am Zürichsee, 1990
 Ein Querkopf braucht kein Alibi: Szenen der Geschichte. Frankfurt/M – Berlin, 1991, 
 Warum so bedrückt? Deutschland hat Zukunft. Hrsg., Hohenrain-Verlag, Tübingen 1992, .
 Unsere gestohlene Geschichte. Deutsche Akademie für Bildung und Kultur, München 1992
 Handbuch zur Deutschen Nation, Band 4, Deutschlands Einigung und Europas Zukunft. Hrsg., Tübingen, 1992

Honours 
 1979 Kulturpreis für Wissenschaft der Sudetendeutschen Landsmannschaft
 1980 Südmährischer Kulturpreis
 1980 Johannes Mathesius – Medaille
 1983 Kant-Plakette der Deutschen Akademie für Bildung und Kultur
 1988 Goldener Ehrenring „Der deutschen Literatur“ des Deutschen Kulturwerkes Europäischen Geistes
 1990 Bismarck-Medaille in Gold
 1992 Schiller-Preis des Deutschen Kulturwerks Europäischen Geistes (DKEG)

External links 
 Hellmut Diwald
 Obituary by Alfred Schickel

1924 births
1993 deaths
People from Šatov
Moravian-German people
Czechoslovak emigrants to Germany
German male non-fiction writers
German people of Moravian-German descent
20th-century German people
20th-century German historians
University of Hamburg alumni
Academic staff of the University of Erlangen-Nuremberg
University of Erlangen-Nuremberg alumni